Sri Lanka Navy Sports Club is a first-class cricket team in Sri Lanka. They played their debut first-class match against Nondescripts Cricket Club in January 2001.

The team is under the patronage of the Sri Lanka Navy.

See also
 List of Sri Lankan cricket teams

References

External links
 Sri Lanka Navy Sports Club at CricInfo

Sri Lankan first-class cricket teams
Sri Lanka Navy
Sri Lanka Navy Sports Club cricketers
Military cricket teams